This table displays the top-rated primetime television series of the 1989–90 season as measured by Nielsen Media Research.

References

1989 in American television
1990 in American television
1989-related lists
1990-related lists
Lists of American television series